Carlos Noel Tiscareño Rodríguez (born 21 September 1974) is a Mexican politician affiliated with the National Action Party. As of 2014 he served as Deputy of the LIX Legislature of the Mexican Congress representing Jalisco.

References

1974 births
Living people
Politicians from Guadalajara, Jalisco
National Action Party (Mexico) politicians
Deputies of the LIX Legislature of Mexico
Members of the Chamber of Deputies (Mexico) for Jalisco